Nitish Naik is an Indian cardiologist, known for his expertise in cardiovascular diseases, and is an additional professor at the All India Institute of Medical Sciences. He was honoured by the Government of India, in 2014, by bestowing on him the Padma Shri, the fourth highest civilian award, for his contributions to the field of medicine. He is reported to have treated Manmohan Singh, Sonia Gandhi and the Lashkar-e-Taiba operative in India, Abdul Karim Tunda.

References

Living people
Recipients of the Padma Shri in medicine
Indian cardiologists
20th-century Indian medical doctors
Year of birth missing (living people)